Steven Hallworth (born 1 December 1995) is an English former professional snooker player. He is the only ever qualified professional from Lincoln. He is a practice partner of Stuart Carrington.

Career

Junior 
Hallworth started playing snooker aged 10 after trying pool on a family holiday. He then found success in junior and amateur levels and was given the opportunity to play future World Champion Mark Selby aged 12 in 2009, after winning that year's Under-17 Lincoln and District Billiards and Snooker Association crown. He was also one 8 finalists in the 2010 Rileys Future Stars competition run by Ronnie O'Sullivan, but lost out to Joel Walker.

Amateur 
Hallworth then progressed on to Players Tour Championship events in 2011 and Q School in 2013, but it wasn't until the 2013–14 when Hallworth started to progress to the main rounds of PTC events, a 4–3 defeat to Kurt Maflin in the Paul Hunter Classic and a 4–0 loss to former World Champion Mark Williams in the Antwerp Open. It was also Hallworth's televised debut. Hallworth's performances in the EBSA Amateur Cup Events were enough to qualify him for the six-man play-off event, with three players winning two-year professional tour cards on the World Snooker Tour, with a win in the Antwerp event. Hallworth beat Martin Ball 4–1 in the first round, before beating Mitchell Travis 4–3 in the final round to earn place on the tour the 2014–15 and 2015–16 seasons.

Professional 
Hallworth failed to qualify for the opening two ranking events in the 2014–15 season, but did secure his first win as a professional, beating Zak Surety 5–4 in the first qualifying round of the Australian Goldfields Open. All 128 players on the snooker tour automatically play in the first round of the UK Championship and in Hallworth's debut at the venue stage of a ranking event he lost 6–1 to Mark Williams. In the Welsh Open first round he took Shaun Murphy to a deciding frame but lost it to be edged out 4–3. Hallworth led reigning Indian Open champion Michael White 4–0 in the opening round of World Championship qualifying, before losing seven frames in a row and went on to be defeated 10–8. He ended his first season on tour as the world number 116.

A run of 10 consecutive defeats from June 2015 to December was ended when Hallworth overcame Thepchaiya Un-Nooh 5–4 in the German Masters qualifiers. He then beat Andy Hicks 5–4 on the final black to play in a ranking event outside of the United Kingdom for the first time, but was whitewashed 5–0 by world number one Mark Selby. Hallworth dropped off the tour at the end of the season and failed to advance through Q School.

Return to amateur status 
Hallworth defeated Hossein Vafaei 4–3 to qualify for the Indian Open and narrowly lost 4–3 to Stuart Bingham in the opening round. The Shoot-Out was upgraded to a ranking event this season and Hallworth made the quarter-finals with wins over Boonyarit Keattikun, Michael White, Daniel Wells and Li Hang. His run came to an end at the hands of Andy Hicks. He whitewashed Darryl Hill 4–0 at the Gibraltar Open, before losing 4–1 to Nigel Bond in the second round. Hallworth was a win away from earning a two-year tour card at the EBSA Play-off, but was bested 4–1 by Gerard Greene.

At the end of the 2017/18 season, he entered Q School in an attempt to win back a place on the professional snooker tour. He earnt a credible victory over Zhao Xintong.

In 2022/23 season he has reached the last 16 of the 2022 British Open he beat Barry Hawkins 4-3.

Performance and rankings timeline

References

External links
Steven Hallworth at wst.tv

English snooker players
People from North Kesteven District
1995 births
Living people
Sportspeople from Lincolnshire